Woman by Woman:  New Hope for the Villages of India is a 2001 documentary film by filmmaker, Dorothy Fadiman.

Synopsis
The film follows several women from small villages in India who come out of seclusion to serve their communities by teaching, particularly to other women, about family planning resources. The women are trained through Janani which is a non-profit health organization founded in the state of Bihar, India by way of DKT International.  The women become rural medical practitioners and counselors.

Release and reception
The film premiered in Palo Alto and afterwards, Chitra Banerjee Divakaruni presided as a moderator for a panel which included Kavita Nandini Ramdas(the president at the time of the Global Fund for Women), LS Aravinda (coordinator with Association for India's Development), and Richard T. Schlosberg III. The film also participated twice in 2001 and 2009 at the United Nations Association Film Festival at Stanford University.  The documentary won a FREDDIE Award at the 2002 International Health and Medical Media Festival.

Rediff.com described the message of the film as "change individuals can make". This message is spread by examples, such as a woman being encouraged by her mother-in-law to advance in the community, and a woman that works as an equal with her husband.

References

External links 
 
 Woman by Woman: New Hope for the Villages of India at vimeo.com
 Woman by Woman: New Hope for the Villages of India (Hindi Version) at vimeo.com
 The Film's Page at Culture Unplugged 
 The film's Page on Internet Archive  
 the Harsh Days of Their Lives March 2001
 Woman by Woman 
 "Woman to woman"  March 23, 2001 from the Palo Alto Weekly

2001 films
American documentary films
2000s Hindi-language films
Documentary films about women in India
2001 documentary films
Films directed by Dorothy Fadiman
2000s American films